Pedro Bantigue y Natividad, (January 31, 1920 – November 20, 2012) was a Filipino prelate of the Roman Catholic Church. He is notably the first bishop in the Philippines to come from Hagonoy, as well as the Province of Bulacan.

Biography
Bantigue was born in Hagonoy, and was ordained a priest in the Archdiocese of Manila on May 31, 1945. He was appointed auxiliary bishop of the Archdiocese of Manila on May 29, 1961, as well as titular bishop of Catula, receiving his episcopal ordination on July 25, 1961. On January 25, 1967, he was appointed the very first bishop of the Diocese of San Pablo and would remain in office until his retirement on July 12, 1995. 

Bantigue died on November 20, 2012, at the age of 92.

References

External links
Catholic-Hierarchy

1920 births
2012 deaths
People from Bulacan
20th-century Roman Catholic bishops in the Philippines
Participants in the Second Vatican Council
Roman Catholic bishops of San Pablo
Filipino bishops